Catherine Ann Novelli (born 1957) is president of Listening for America, a non-profit organization in international trade policy. She was formerly a U.S. diplomat who served as Under Secretary of State for Economic Growth, Energy, and the Environment at the U.S. Department of State from 2014 to 2017. She was also the State Department's Senior Coordinator for International Information Technology Diplomacy.

Early life and education
Novelli is a graduate of Tufts University, holds a law degree from the University of Michigan and a Master of Laws from the University of London (with concentrations in international and comparative law at the London School of Economics and School of Oriental and Asian Studies).

Career
Novelli served as Assistant U.S. Trade Representative for Europe and the Mediterranean from 1991 to 2005. She then served as Vice-President of Worldwide Government Affairs at Apple, Inc. from 2005 to 2013.

President Barack Obama nominated Novelli as Under Secretary for Economic Growth, Energy, and the Environment on September 24, 2013. Novelli was sworn in on February 18, 2014.

In 2015, President Obama unsuccessfully nominated Novelli to be United States Alternate Governor of the European Bank for Reconstruction and Development. Her nomination expired upon the swearing in of a new Congress in January 2017.

Personal life
Novelli is married to David J. Apol, who is the acting Director of the United States Office of Government Ethics.  They met in law school and have two children, Katie and Daniel Apol.

References

American diplomats
American women diplomats
Living people
Tufts University alumni
United States Under Secretaries of State
University of Michigan Law School alumni
Alumni of the University of London
Place of birth missing (living people)
1957 births
21st-century American diplomats
21st-century American women
Obama administration personnel